Themone is a genus in the butterfly family Riodinidae present only in the Neotropical realm.

Species
Themone pais (Hübner, [1820]) present in French Guiana, Guyana, Suriname, Venezuela, Brazil and Peru
Themone poecila Bates, 1868 present in Brazil
Themone pulcherrima (Herrich-Schäffer, [1853]) present in Suriname

Sources
Themone at Markku Savela's website on Lepidoptera

External links

Themone at Butterflies of America

Riodininae
Butterfly genera
Taxa named by John O. Westwood